Robert Avel Holz (born February 3, 1958) is an American drummer and composer. Holz was born in Syracuse, New York and  resides in Los Angeles, California. He played with jazz guitarist Larry Coryell between 2015 and 2017 and has led his own groups, Bob Holz and A Vision Forward and Bob Holz Band.

Biography 
Holz started his jazz studies in Boston attending the Berklee College of Music. Thereafter he went on to study with Billy Cobham and Dave Weckl.

Holz's  third album for MVD Audio, Visions:Coast To Coast Connection with A Vision Forward was released in 2018 and featured Stanley Clarke, Randy Brecker, Alex Machacek, Ralphe Armstrong and Chet Catallo.

On February 8, 2019 Holz released the album Silverthorne on MVD Audio. The album features Holz on drums, guitarist Mike Stern, trumpeter Randy Brecker, bassist Ralphe Armstrong, saxophonist Brandon Fields (musician), guitarist Jamie Glaser, guitarist Alex Machacek, saxophonist Ada Rovatti, bassist Andrew Ford, keyboardist Billy Steinway and percussionist Alex Acuna.

Discography 

 With Bob Holz and A Vision Forward
 2016: A Vision Forward (MVD Audio)feat Larry Coryell, Mike Stern and Randy Brecker
 2017: Visions And Friends (MVD Audio)feat Larry Coryell and Randy Brecker
 2018: Visions:Coast To Coast Connection (MVD Audio), feat Stanley Clarke and Randy Brecker
 2019: Silverthorne (MVD Audio),feat Mike Stern and Randy Brecker

References

External links 
 

1958 births
Living people
American jazz drummers
American rock drummers
American session musicians
Jazz fusion drummers
20th-century American drummers
American male drummers
20th-century American male musicians
American male jazz musicians
Musicians from Syracuse, New York
Musical groups from Syracuse, New York
Jazz musicians from New York (state)
American jazz composers
Post-bop composers
American male jazz composers
21st-century jazz composers
21st-century American male musicians